Saskatoon City Council is the governing body of Saskatoon, the largest city in the central Canadian province of Saskatchewan. It consists of ten councillors representing ten wards throughout the city and the mayor of Saskatoon, who is elected city-wide. The current council was elected to a four-year term on November 13, 2020.

Historical background 
Saskatoon City Council held its inaugural meeting on June 26, 1906, when the city was inaugurated, growing from what had been the Town Council. Until 1954, the mayor and councillors were elected every year; after that and until 1970, the mayor was elected biannually. After 1970, the mayor and councillors were elected to three year terms, until 2012 when the term was extended to four years.

The format of elections has also changed over time, alternating between ward-based and at-large systems. The former has been in place since 1994, and was also used from 1906-1920, when there were initially four and then five wards with two councillors per ward, and 1973-1988, when there were also ten wards with one councillor per ward.

Since 1906, 198 individuals have served as councillors and 27 have served as mayor, with 23 mayors having first served as councillors.

Mayor

Councillors

Notes
 Councillor was elected in a by-election.

See also
 List of Mayors of Saskatoon
2020 Saskatchewan municipal elections

References

External links
 Saskatoon City Council
 Saskatoon City Councillor profiles
 Past election results
 Map of Saskatoon Wards (2020)

Municipal councils in Saskatchewan
Politics of Saskatoon